The Dagu River is a 180-km-long river in Shandong province, China, originating from Mount Fu in Zhaoyuan, Shandong and emptying into the Jiaozhou Bay in Qingdao. It has a drainage area of 6131.3 km2 and is responsible for over 85% of the fresh water supply to the Jiaozhou Bay.

References

Rivers of China
Rivers of Shandong